Three on a Ticket is a 1947 American crime film directed by Sam Newfield and written by Fred Myton. It is based on the 1942 novel The Corpse Came Calling by Brett Halliday. The film stars Hugh Beaumont, Cheryl Walker, Paul Bryar, Ralph Dunn, Louise Currie, Gavin Gordon, Charles Quigley and Douglas Fowley. The film was released on April 4, 1947, by Producers Releasing Corporation.

Plot

Cast      
Hugh Beaumont as Michael Shayne
Cheryl Walker as Phyllis Hamilton
Paul Bryar as Tim Rourke
Ralph Dunn as Inspector Pete Rafferty
Louise Currie as Helen Brimstead
Gavin Gordon as Pearson aka Barton
Charles Quigley as Kurt Leroy
Douglas Fowley as Mace Morgan
Noel Cravat as Trigger
Charles King as Drunk
Brooks Benedict as Jim Lacy

References

External links
 

1947 films
1940s English-language films
American crime films
1947 crime films
Producers Releasing Corporation films
Films directed by Sam Newfield
American black-and-white films
1940s American films